Borromean is something connected to the family of Borromeo or to the Borromean rings. That may be,

Borromean clinic
Borromean Islands
Borromean nucleus
Borromean rings
Molecular Borromean rings